Darko Drinić (Serbian Cyrillic: Дарко Дринић; born 27 October 1981) is a Serbian former professional footballer who played as a striker.

Career
During his journeyman career, Drinić played for Novi Sad (twice), Železnik, Borac Čačak, Voždovac, Dalian Shide, Bnei Sakhnin, Veternik, Sloga Kraljevo, Proleter Novi Sad, Kolubara, Železničar Lajkovac, and Polet Ljubić.

Honours
Železnik
 Serbia and Montenegro Cup: 2004–05
Sloga Kraljevo
 Serbian League West: 2010–11
Kolubara
 Serbian League Belgrade: 2013–14

External links
 
 
 

Association football forwards
Bnei Sakhnin F.C. players
Chinese Super League players
Dalian Shide F.C. players
Expatriate footballers in China
Expatriate footballers in Israel
First League of Serbia and Montenegro players
FK Borac Čačak players
RFK Novi Sad 1921 players
FK Polet Ljubić players
FK Proleter Novi Sad players
FK Veternik players
FK Voždovac players
FK Železničar Lajkovac players
FK Železnik players
Israeli Premier League players
People from Titel
Serbia and Montenegro footballers
Serbian expatriate footballers
Serbian expatriate sportspeople in China
Serbian expatriate sportspeople in Israel
Serbian First League players
Serbian footballers
Serbian SuperLiga players
1981 births
Living people